Andrew Page (born 1963/1964) is a British businessman, and the co-founder and chairman of Alfa Financial Software.

In 1990, Page co-founded CHP Consulting, which was rebranded as Alfa Financial Software in November 2016.

Following the flotation of Alfa in May 2017, Page was expected to sell shares worth in excess of £180 million. In 2017, his net worth was estimated at £270 million.

References

Living people
British company founders
Year of birth missing (living people)
1960s births